Fish Hoek Library is a public library in the seaside suburb of Fish Hoek in Cape Town, South Africa. It was ranked 5th in the City of Cape Town's top circulating libraries in 2015

The library provides access to two online encyclopedias. The library's holdings can be searched online via the City of Cape Town's Open Public Access Catalogue (OPAC).

Fish Hoek is a bedroom community with approximately 12,000 residents. To allow commuters to access resources, the library is open on Monday and Thursday evenings. The library opened on 1 April 1954 in an old municipal building and was run for the next 36 years by Ethel May Gillard. The library opened its current location in 1988

The children's section of the library is used by grandparents who are taking care of their grandchildren while parents are working in the city. On Friday mornings, the library operates a Story Hour for small children.

As part of the Smartcape initiative for poor residents of Cape Town, the library also offers free access to 10 computers, which can be used to edit documents, create presentations and access the internet. Also a part of community outreach programs is a book service to local old-age homes, as well as specialised services to local home schoolers.

The library holds a monthly literary tea talk, featuring local authors, who visit to discuss their books and conducts a regular book sale. Originally begun as a fundraising event, the annual "Library Alive" promotional fundraiser is now a regular annual event.

In 2015, the library implemented the annual "Blown Away By Books" festival. Although originally presented by Fish Hoek Library, the festival has now grown to include nearby libraries in Masiphumelele, Ocean View, Kommetjie and Simons Town.

On the second and last Saturdays of the month, the library hosts a craft market.

The library in the Masiphumelele township was managed by the Fish Hoek library from 2003 until 2010, when it was reclassified as a separate branch.

See also 
Rondebosch Library
University of Cape Town Libraries

References 

Libraries in Cape Town